MacArthur Square is a Tide Light Rail station in Norfolk, Virginia. Opened in August 2011, it is situated in downtown Norfolk in a small block bounded by Plume Street, City Hall Avenue, Bank Street and Atlantic Street.

The station is adjacent to the MacArthur Center, MacArthur Memorial (former Norfolk City Hall), the Norfolk Library Downtown Branch, the business district along Main Street, Waterside Festival Marketplace, Nauticus, and many of downtown's larger hotels.  This station is also the closest to HRT's Elizabeth River Ferry service to Downtown Portsmouth.

References

External links 

MacArthur Square station

Tide Light Rail stations
Railway stations in the United States opened in 2011
2011 establishments in Virginia